Leonida Kasaya (born ) is a Kenyan volleyball player. She is part of the Kenya women's national volleyball team.

She participated in the 2014 FIVB Volleyball World Grand Prix, 2018 FIVB Volleyball Women's World Championship, 2020 Summer Olympics qualification.
On club level she plays for Kenya Pipeline company.
 
Kasaya was included in the dozen Kenyan players chosen to travel to the postponed 2020 Summer Olympics in Tokyo. Mercy Moim is the captain and their first match is against the home team from Japan.

References

External links
 Profile at FIVB.org

1993 births
Living people
Kenyan women's volleyball players
Place of birth missing (living people)
Volleyball players at the 2020 Summer Olympics
Olympic volleyball players of Kenya
People from Kakamega